Chinnappadass is a 1989 Indian Tamil-language film directed by C. V. Rajendran, his final film as director. The film stars Sathyaraj and Radha. It is a remake of the Hindi film Insaaf. The film was released on 28 July 1989.

Plot 

Chinnappadass, who is a post-graduate in law and a law college professor, gets suspended from teaching job when he thrashes rowdies who happens to be the children of corrupt ministers who tried to molest his sister. Due to compulsion, Chinnappadass had to join the smuggling gang of Ravi Prakash. When Dileep tries to rape Radha, she commits suicide. Chinnappadass then pretends to be amnesiac to find the truth. However he is shocked to find that Radha's look alike twin sister who is Dr. Kavitha. In the end, Chinnappadass with the help of Inspector Balaraman catches all baddies and finally marries Dr. Kavitha.

Cast

Soundtrack 
The soundtrack was composed by Ilaiyaraaja.

Reception 
P. S. S. of Kalki wrote that the well-chosen exteriors, the settings, the costumes, and the lavishly spent currencies all spent with the intention of doing something useful in a somewhat believable story would have been overwhelming.

References

External links 
 

1980s masala films
1980s Tamil-language films
1989 action films
1989 films
Films about educators
Films directed by C. V. Rajendran
Films scored by Ilaiyaraaja
Films set in universities and colleges
Films shot in Rajasthan
Indian action films
Tamil remakes of Hindi films